Ricardo Cecil Williams (born 3 February 1968) is a former English cricketer. He played for Gloucestershire between 1991 and 1995. He also played Minor Counties cricket for Bedfordshire in 1996.

References

External links

1968 births
Living people
English cricketers
Gloucestershire cricketers
People from Camberwell
Cricketers from Greater London
Bedfordshire cricketers